The 2010 Irwin Tools Night Race was a NASCAR Sprint Cup Series stock car race that was held on August 21, 2010 at Bristol Motor Speedway in Bristol, Tennessee. Contested over 500 laps, it was the twenty-fourth race of the 2010 Sprint Cup Series season. Kyle Busch of Joe Gibbs Racing won the race, while David Reutimann finished second, and Jamie McMurray clinched third.

Pole position driver Jimmie Johnson maintained his lead on the first lap to begin the race, as Carl Edwards, who started in the second position on the grid, remained behind him. Afterward, Kyle Busch became the leader, and would eventually lead to the race high of 282 laps. On lap 163, early race leader Johnson had collided with Juan Pablo Montoya; when he returned to the track he was seventy-seven laps behind the leader. David Reutimann led after the final pit stops, ahead of Kyle Busch and Jamie McMurray. With seventy-one laps remaining, Kyle Busch passed Reutimann, holding the lead through to the race win.

There were seven cautions and seventeen lead changes among nine different drivers throughout the course of the race. It was Kyle Busch's third win of the season and the nineteenth of his career. The result moved him up five spots to third in the Drivers' Championship, 351 points behind of leader Kevin Harvick and fifty-seven ahead of Carl Edwards. Chevrolet maintained its lead in the Manufacturers' Championship, twenty-seven ahead of Toyota, sixty-three ahead of Ford and seventy-four ahead of Dodge with twelve races remaining in the season. A total of 155,000 people attended the race, while 5.842 million watched it on television.

With the win, Kyle Busch completed a historic Triple Threat sweep, winning in all three of the top NASCAR national series on the same weekend, winning the O'Reilly Auto Parts 200 in the Camping World Truck Series, the Food City 250 in the Nationwide Series and finishing with this win in the Sprint Cup Series.

Report

Background 

Bristol Motor Speedway is one of five short tracks to hold NASCAR races; the others are Dover International Speedway, Phoenix International Raceway, Richmond International Raceway, and Martinsville Speedway. The track's turns are banked from twenty-four to thirty degrees, while the front stretch, the location of the finish line, is banked from six to ten degrees. The back stretch also has banking from six to ten degrees.

Before the race, Kevin Harvick led the Drivers' Championship with 3,400 points, and Jeff Gordon stood in second with 3,107 points. Denny Hamlin was third in the Drivers' Championship with 3,047 points; Tony Stewart was fourth with 3,020 while Jimmie Johnson was in fifth with 3,014. In the Manufacturers' Championship, Chevrolet was leading with 167 points, thirty points ahead of their rival Toyota. Ford, with 106 points, was ten points ahead of Dodge in the battle for third.

Practice and qualifying 
Two practice sessions was held before the Saturday race—both on Friday. The first session lasted 120 minutes, while the second session lasted 45 minutes. During the first practice session, David Gilliland was fastest, ahead of Robby Gordon and Dale Earnhardt Jr. in second and third respectively. Jeff Gordon was scored fourth, while A. J. Allmendinger was placed fifth, even though the latter had spun sideways twice in the session. In the second and final practice session, Ryan Newman was scored quickest, as Carl Edwards and Gilliland followed in the second and third positions. Jimmie Johnson was scored in the fourth position, while his teammate Jeff Gordon followed in fifth.

50 cars were entered for qualifying, due NASCAR's qualifying procedure, only 43 could race. Johnson clinched his twenty-fourth career pole position, with a time of 15.540 seconds. He was joined on the front row of the grid by Edwards. Joey Logano qualified third, Tony Stewart took fourth, and David Reutimann started fifth. Six drivers did not qualify because one team, the second car for Tommy Baldwin Racing, withdrew from qualifying. They were Dave Blaney, Joe Nemechek, Kevin Lepage, J. J. Yeley, Brian Keselowski, and Mike Bliss. Also during qualifying, Jeff Gordon spun sideways and flattened his tires, but after changing tires, he qualified twenty-sixth.

Race summary 
The race, the twenty-fourth out of a total of thirty-six in the season, began at 7:30 p.m. EDT and was televised live in the United States on ABC. The race was preempted in Southeast Michigan due to that year's Woodward Dream Cruise, broadcast on Scripps-owned WXYZ-TV in Southfield, Michigan. Ruth Graham daughter of evangelist Billy Graham, began pre-race ceremonies by giving the invocation. Next, children of the drivers and pit crews from Motor Racing Outreach performed the national anthem, and Irwin Tools Ultimate Tradesman Challenge winner Delwyn Thorton gave the command for drivers to start their engines.

Jimmie Johnson held the lead going through the first corner with Carl Edwards behind him. After starting fourth, Tony Stewart passed Edwards for the second position. David Reutimann's fourth position was filled by Ryan Newman on lap 4. By lap seventeen, Johnson and Stewart were ahead of Edwards by 1.8 seconds. On lap 22, Paul Menard moved into the tenth position, after passing Matt Kenseth. Juan Pablo Montoya moved into the sixth position by lap 27. After twenty-nine laps, Robby Gordon and Michael McDowell had driven to the garage as start-and-parks. Two laps later, Menard had moved into the ninth position. On lap 38, Montoya moved into the fifth position, after passing Reutimann.

After starting twentieth, Kurt Busch had moved up to the twelfth position by lap 51. Seven laps later, the first caution came out because David Gilliland collided with the wall. After the drivers had finished their pit stops, Johnson led to the green flag. Stewart moved into the first position one lap later, but he could not maintain it for the second consecutive lap. On lap 65, Kasey Kahne received a drive-through penalty after driving too fast on pit lane. Nine laps later, Kyle Busch moved into the eighth position, as his brother Kurt followed. Afterward, Montoya moved into the sixth position. By lap 81, Johnson had a 0.60 second lead over Stewart. Two laps later, Jamie McMurray passed Kenseth for the tenth position.

On lap 96, Kyle Busch passed Montoya for sixth, as Stewart was gaining ground on Johnson. Two laps later, Edwards caught Stewart for the second position. After 107 laps, Johnson had a 0.65 second lead over Stewart. On lap 127, David Ragan had spun sideways, which prompted the second caution to come out. During the accident, Tony Raines collided in the back of Stewart's race car. Following the caution, Johnson led to the green flag on lap 130. One lap later, the third caution was given because Regan Smith collided with the wall. On lap 140, Johnson led the drivers to the green flag. After starting twenty-first, Greg Biffle had moved into the eleventh position by lap 142. On lap 153, Kevin Harvick said, "We don't know what we're doing. Leave the air alone.", after being frustrated that his crew could not fix the car handling.

On lap 161, there were twenty-eight cars on the lead lap (not a lap down). Eleven laps later, Kyle Busch emerged in the first position, after passing Johnson. By lap 187, Kyle Busch had a 0.96 second lead over Johnson. On lap 192, one of Scott Speed's tires deflated, prompting the fourth caution. Johnson became the leader after pit stops, and led the drivers back to the green flag. On lap 202, Busch reclaimed the lead, as Reutimann passed Johnson for second. Eleven laps later, Stewart collided with the wall, but was able to continue racing. On lap 215, Johnson reclaimed second, after passing Reutimann. Twenty-one laps later, Clint Bowyer passed Kurt Busch for the ninth position. By lap 239, Kyle Busch had a 2.5 second lead over Johnson.

On lap 253, the fifth caution came out because Bobby Labonte collided with the wall. On lap 261, Kyle Busch led the drivers to the green flag. One lap later, Johnson spun sideways and collided with the wall, after making contact with Montoya. Johnson and Denny Hamlin drove to garage during the caution, both with repairs. Kyle Busch, once again, led the drivers to the restart on lap 267. By lap 279, Kyle Busch had a 1.48 second lead over Reutimann. Ten laps later, Hamlin returned to the track, as Kyle Busch had a 1.75 second lead over the second position. On lap 302, Gordon passed A. J. Allmendinger for the tenth position. Eight laps later, Matt Kenseth passed Dale Earnhardt Jr. for the seventh position. On lap 339, McMurray moved into the third position. Four laps later, McMurray passed Reutimann for second. Kyle Busch maintained a 1.57 lead over McMurray, as Kenseth, who was running eighth, drove to pit lane because of tire issues.

On lap 350, Kahne moved into the sixth position. Eight laps later, McMurray had closed on Kyle Busch. By lap 380, Kyle Busch had claimed the most laps led. Three laps later, Kahne came to pit lane because of a flat tire. On lap 388, McMurray became the leader, after passing Kyle Busch. On lap 399, green flag pit stops began, as McMurray and Kyle Busch came to pit lane for fuel and tires. Afterwards, Jeff Gordon became the leader, but one lap later he was passed by Mark Martin. On lap 404, Reutimann became the leader, as Joey Logano was given a drive-through penalty for speeding on pit lane. Four laps later, the seventh caution came out because of debris on the track. Reutimann led on the restart during lap 414.

Four laps later, Kahne reclaimed the sixth position, as Kyle Busch caught Reutimann. On lap 429, Kyle Busch became the leader, after bumping Reutimann. Kahne moved into the fourth position, after passing Bowyer two laps later. By lap 434, Kyle Busch had a 1.5 second lead over Reutimann. Fifteen laps later, Kurt Busch passed Jeff Gordon for the tenth position. After 467 laps, there were only fourteen cars on the same lap as the leader. By lap 490, Kyle Busch had a 2.49 second lead over the rest of the drivers. Kyle Busch crossed the finish line in first to make history by becoming the first to win in all three major NASCAR divisions in the same weekend: the Camping World Truck Series, the Nationwide Series, and the Sprint Cup Series. David Reutimann followed in second, ahead McMurray in third, Bowyer in fourth, and Kahne in fifth. The race had a total of seven cautions and seventeen lead changes among nine different drivers.

Post-race 

Busch appeared in victory lane after his victory lap to start celebrating making history, and his third win of the season, in front of a crowd of 155,000 people. Busch also earned $331,731 in race winnings. "It's great. We knew we'd run well here and were really looking forward to capitalizing and getting jumped in front of the bubble spot (for the Chase)," said Busch.

Although Reutimann was leading near the end, Busch passed him with seventy-one laps remaining. McMurray, who finished third, said, The balance was too tight at the end. It was a really good night for us. I know most of these fans don't like Kyle Busch, but it's remarkable what he's been able to do this weekend." In the subsequent press conference, Reutimann stated, "My team did a good job, because I was only in the second half of practice, and they had to work with two different drivers, so the credit all goes to my team." "At one point, I thought we were going to have the car to beat, but at the end, we just didn't have the speed we needed," McMurray added. Johnson, who was involved in an accident on lap 263, said, "I thought I left [Montoya] enough room on the outside lane there. We're on the straightaway for a little bit, and then all of the sudden, I got hooked with force. It's not like we bumped and banged, and I squeezed him. I thought we were on the straightaway and everything was fine, and then around I went." Following the race, Busch would add,
"This [car] was awesome today. What a great race car. It's the second time I've run it this year."

The race result left Harvick leading the Driver's Championship with 3,521 points. Jeff Gordon, who finished eleventh, was second with 3,242 points, which assured him a position in the Chase for the Sprint Cup. He was seventy-two points ahead of race winner Kyle Busch and 129 ahead of Edwards. Hamlin was fifth with 3,108 points. Chevrolet maintained their lead in the Manufacturers' Championship with 173 points. Toyota placed second with 146 points, and Ford followed with 110 points, eleven ahead of Dodge in fourth. 5.842 million people watched the race on television. The race took two hours, forty-one minutes and twenty-four seconds to complete, and the margin of victory was 0.677 seconds.

Results

Qualifying

Race results

Standings after the race 

 Note: Only the top five positions are included for both sets of standings.

References 

Irwin Tools Night Race
Irwin Tools Night Race
NASCAR races at Bristol Motor Speedway